Johnston Parish is a civil parish in Queens County, New Brunswick, Canada.

For governance purposes it is divided between the village of Cambridge-Narrows and the local service district of the parish of Johnston, both of which are members of Regional Service Commission 8 (RSC8).

Origin of name
The parish was named in honour of Hugh Johnston Jr., MLA for Queens County and member of the Executive Council at the time. Johnston's father Hugh preceded him as MLA from Saint John County and died there in 1829.

History
Johnston was erected in 1839 from Wickham Parish.

In 1852 part of Johnston was included in the newly erected Cambridge Parish.

In 1856 the boundary with Cambridge Parish was altered.

Boundaries
Johnston Parish is bounded:

 on the east by a line running north-northwesterly from north of the end of Chittick Road in Marrtown, crossing the Canaan River east of Phillips Brook and striking the Waterborough Parish line about 2 kilometres northwest of Parks Lake;
 on the southeast by the Kings County line;
 on the west by a line running north from the Kings County line along Route 695 and Watson Road to Washademoak Lake, then upstream through the middle of the lake to a point about three hundred metres southwest of Fowlers Cove, then northeasterly to Route 715, then northwesterly along the highway and Fowler Road to the Waterborough Parish line about 1.5 kilometres past the junction of Fowler Road with Route 715;
 on the northwest by a line running north 54º east from a point on the Saint John River about 1.8 kilometres southwest of the Route 715 bridge over McAlpines Brook.

Communities
Communities at least partly within the parish.

 Annidale
  Bagdad
 Cambridge-Narrows
 Hammtown
 Canaan Rapids
 Chambres Corner
  Codys
  Coles Island
 Goshen
 Highfield
 Long Creek
 Partridge Valley
 Phillipstown
 Salmon Creek
 Smith Corner
 Thornetown
 Washademoak
 Waterloo Corner
 Youngs Cove Road

Bodies of water
Bodies of water at least partly within the parish.
  Canaan River
 Long Creek
 Salmon Creek
 Washademoak Lake

Islands
Islands at least partly within the parish.
 Coles Island

Other notable places
Parks, historic sites, and other noteworthy places at least partly within the parish.
 Partridge Valley East Protected Natural Area
 Phillipstown Protected Natural Area

Demographics
Parish population total does not include portion within Cambridge-Narrows

Population
Population trend

Language
Mother tongue (2016)

Access Routes
Highways and numbered routes that run through the parish, including external routes that start or finish at the parish limits:

Highways
none

Principal Routes

Secondary Routes:

External Routes:
None

See also
List of parishes in New Brunswick

Notes

References

Parishes of Queens County, New Brunswick
Local service districts of Queens County, New Brunswick